The Garden is Zero 7's third studio album. It was released in the United Kingdom on 22 May 2006, and in the United States on 6 June 2006.

The album features vocal performances by José González, Sia, and Henry Binns. It sees Zero 7 take a new, more upbeat musical direction, while still essentially maintaining their original sound.

The artwork for the album is by Gideon London and the CD was named after his collage. The Album was Nominated for a 2007 Grammy Award in the category 'Best Electronic/Dance Album'.

Track listing

Notes
 "Futures" (acoustic version) is not available for purchase individually.

Singles

Charts

Weekly charts

Year-end charts

Certifications

References

External links
 Zero 7 official website
 

Zero 7 albums
2006 albums
Atlantic Records albums